Monte Cristo Homestead is a historic homestead located in the town of Junee, New South Wales, Australia. Constructed by local pioneer Christopher William Crawley in 1885, it is a double-storey late-Victorian-style manor standing on a hill overlooking the town.

The Crawley family remained in residence until 1948. The house then stood empty under the care of several caretakers until 1963, when it was purchased by Reg and Olive Ryan, who restored it to its current condition. The homestead operates as a museum and antiques showcase, and tourist attraction with curio/souvenir shop, advertising itself as "Australia's most haunted house".

Monte Cristo has been featured in television shows such as A Big Country in 1977, the travel show Getaway in 1992, the paranormal based game/reality show Scream Test in 2000, Ghost Hunters International in January 2010, and My Ghost Story in 2013. It was also the focus of the 2012 mockumentary horror film Muirhouse.

References

External links
Official website

Reportedly haunted locations in New South Wales
Houses in New South Wales
Houses completed in 1885
Australian folklore
Junee, New South Wales
1885 establishments in Australia
Victorian architecture in Australia